Halfway Creek is a stream in the U.S. state of Indiana.

Halfway Creek received its name from its location midway between Portland and Muncie.

See also
List of rivers of Indiana

References

Rivers of Delaware County, Indiana
Rivers of Jay County, Indiana
Rivers of Indiana